WRSW (1480 AM) is a radio station  broadcasting a news/talk format to the Warsaw, Indiana, United States, area. The station is owned by Kensington Digital Media of Indiana, L.L.C.

References

External links

Radio Locator Information for W259BJ

RSW
News and talk radio stations in the United States
Kosciusko County, Indiana